LCII or variation, may refer to:

 Macintosh LC II, 1990s personal computer
 LC II pelvic fracture in the Young-Burgess classification
 Local Council II, a type of local administration in Uganda; see Local Council (Uganda)
 Late Cypriot II period, a period of the Mediterranean Bronze Age in the Late Bronze Age collapse
 LCI Industries, see List of S&P 600 companies

See also

 LC2 (disambiguation)
 LCI (disambiguation)